The High Commission of Canada in Barbados is Canada's main diplomatic mission to Barbados. The exact location is Bishop's Hill Court in Bridgetown, St. Michael. The auspices of the High Commission to Barbados also include issues involving the neighbouring Eastern Caribbean islands of Antigua and Barbuda, Dominica, Grenada, Saint Kitts and Nevis, Saint Lucia and Saint Vincent and the Grenadines, as well as three British overseas territories: Anguilla, the British Virgin Islands and Montserrat. It also includes consular and trade services for Guadeloupe, Martinique, Saint-Martin and Sint Maarten.

The High Commission provides business and consular services to residents and visitors to and from Canada.  Additionally, the High Commissioner also serves as the honorary leader of the non-profit Canada Barbados Business Association (CCBA) organization and a liaison for Canada to the Caribbean Development Bank (CDB).  The current resident High Commissioner from Canada stationed in Bridgetown is Marie Legault, who has a long career in international diplomacy. The office of the High Commissioner also works with the 3,000-4,000 registered Canadian permanent residents who reside in Barbados.

Canadian immigration services were moved from Barbados to Trinidad in recent years for the purposes of cost savings. This means that all Caribbean people applying to immigrate to Canada from islands surrounding Barbados must apply through the office in Port of Spain, Trinidad.

In 2011 the High Commission investigated relocating as it was believed it might have been built above a cave.

Past High Commissioners

James Russell McKinney (1966/11/30 – 1969/07/19)
Gerald Anthony Rau (1969/08/21	– 1972/07/24)
David Chalmer Reece (1972/08/28 – 1973/09/27)
Lawrence Austin Haynes Smith† (1973/09/27 – 1977/11/05)
Trevor John Pinnacle (1977/11/05 – 1979/01/18)
Allan Barclay Roger (1979/01/18 – 1983/08/28)
Noble Edward Charles Power‡ (1983/10/13	– 1987/10/31)
Arthur Robert Wright (1987/11/09 – 1990/07/29)
Janet P. Zukowsky (1990/10/08 – 1994/00/00)
Colleen Swords (1994/08/31 – 1997?)
Duane Van Beselaere (1997/10/30 – 2000/08/11)
Sandelle D. Scrimshaw (2000/09/13 – 2004?)
Michael C. Welsh (2004/08/09 – 2007?)
David Marshall (2007/08/31 – 2009?)
Ruth Archibald (2009- 2012)
Richard Hanley (2012-2016)
Marie Legault (current)

Notes

Canadian diplomatic recognition of independent Barbados was given on 30 November 1966. The High Commissioner to Trinidad and Tobago was concurrently accredited as High Commissioner to Barbados, though resident in Trinidad and Tobago.
† Smith Lawrence Austin Hayne - Mr. Smith became the first resident Canadian High Commissioner to Barbados, when a High Commission was established in Barbados on 27 September 1973.
‡ Power Noble Edward Charles - Since 1983, the High Commissioner to Barbados has also held the position of Commissioner to the British Virgin Islands.

See also
 Barbados–Canada relations
 Canada–Caribbean relations
 High Commission of Barbados in Ottawa
 High Commission of the Organisation of Eastern Caribbean States in Ottawa (OECS)

References

External links
 Official website - of the Canadian High Commission in Barbados (English)
 Official website - of the Canadian High Commission in Barbados (Français)
 The Regional Security System (RSS) - website sponsored by the High Commission
 The Canadian Trade Commissioner Service in Barbados
 Canada's DFAIT - on Canada-Barbados relations.
 The Canada Barbados Business Association (CBBA) - High Commissioner is Chairperson of organization.

 

 
Canada
Barbados
Barbados–Canada relations